William John Sherring (September 18, 1877 – September 5, 1964) was a Canadian athlete of English and Irish descent, winner of the marathon race at the 1906 Intercalated Games (or 1906 Olympic Games, as they were at the time considered to be).

During the decade of the early 1900s, Sherring, from Hamilton, Ontario was acknowledged to be a world class marathoner. He had won a second place behind a fellow countryman Jack Caffery at the Boston Marathon in 1900. He also had won the Hamilton Around the Bay Road Race on two occasions.

In 1906, Sherring – an athlete of St. Patrick's Athletic Club – was chosen to represent Canada in the Athens Olympic Games. However, it was left up to him, a working man with meager resources (he was a brakeman at the Grand Trunk Railway), to finance his journey to Athens. Sherring managed to collect an amount claimed to be between $45 and $90 (a clearly insufficient amount to travel to Athens), which he then bet on a horse named Cicely which won with good odds. He arrived to Athens seven weeks before the Olympic Games and started to work as a porter at the Athens railway station.

At the marathon race, the  Sherring proceeded at a steady pace, at one point a half-mile behind the leaders, before taking the lead at about the fifteen mile mark and finishing seven minutes before the next runner. Prince George of Greece ran the last 50 metres of the marathon alongside Sherring. Sherring received a live lamb and a statue of Athena as a reward. When he returned to Canada, Hamilton City Council awarded him $5000 and the City of Toronto awarded him a further $400. Baron Pierre de Coubertin wrote a letter to the Governor General of Canada, Albert Grey, protesting the gifts as inconsistent with the Olympic ideal of "sport for sport's sake." So far as is known, Sherring got to keep his money. The province of Ontario named two new townships in New Ontario (Now part of Cochrane District) in honour of Sherring, Sherring twp and Marathon twp (not to be confused with Marathon, Ontario)

Upon his triumphant return from the marathon, Sherring quit athletics and worked as a customs officer in Hamilton until his retirement in 1942.

Sherring was inducted into the Canada's Sports Hall of Fame in 1955.

After his death, his original claim-to-fame, the Around the Bay Road Race was renamed to the Billy Sherring Memorial Road Race, and Hamilton has since built a Billy Sherring Park to commemorate their most famous athlete.

Sherring is thought to have inspired the founders of Panathinaikos to adopt the shamrock as the Greek multi-sport club's official emblem in 1918.

References

 Jim Smyth, Shamrocks in the Greek Isles: Billy Sheering's Greek Journey, and Mine, New Hibernia Review, Volume 22, Number 4, Winter 2018,9-18.

External links 

 
 
 

1877 births
1964 deaths
Olympic gold medalists for Canada
Olympic track and field athletes of Canada
Canadian male long-distance runners
Canadian male marathon runners
Athletes from Hamilton, Ontario
Athletes (track and field) at the 1906 Intercalated Games
Medalists at the 1906 Intercalated Games
Canadian people of Irish descent
Olympic gold medalists in athletics (track and field)